Capitellum metallicum, the lesser Martinique skink, is a species of skink found in Martinique.

References

metallicum
Reptiles described in 1879
Taxa named by Marie Firmin Bocourt